The Lost World of Tambun (LWOT) is a theme park and hotel in Sunway City Ipoh, Tambun, Kinta District, Perak, Malaysia. Managed by the Sunway Group, the 40-acre park opened on 11 November 2004, and is officiated by Sultan Azlan Shah. With over 80 attractions from 10 parks, including the country's biggest wave pool and longest man-made adventure river, it is surrounded by 400 million old limestone hills over an area of 7,432 m2.

Park history 
The park was opened to the public with four attractions in 2004 with the Water Park, Dry Park, Hot Springs and the Tiger Valley as the first animal enclosure of the theme park. Later in 2006, the Water Park would be extended with the Waterfall Beach Garden and expanded the wildlife with a new attraction for petting animals in 2009. A year later, utilising the natural hot springs surrounded by the park, six geo-thermal hot springs pools and crystal spa open in Lost World Hot Springs & Spa attraction. After construction in 2011, the neighbouring hotel Lost World Hotel opens along with the Lost World Tin Valley (historical Malaysian tin valley exploration), Lost World Adventure Park and Animal Care Centre.

Also, the park holds many records entered in the Malaysia Book of Records, such as the Lost World Adventure River, a 660 meters ride as the "Longest Man-Made River in Malaysia", LWOT and Astro co-organised Malaysia's Largest Gangnam Flash Mob with an attendance of 2303 participants, broke Malaysia Book of Records. This previous record was 1100 participants.

Architecture 
The park was built within the surroundings of limestone hills over an area of 7,432 m2.

Attractions

Public transportation

See also
 List of tourist attractions in Perak
Sunway Group

References

External links

 

2004 establishments in Malaysia
Amusement parks opened in 2004
Amusement parks in Malaysia
Buildings and structures in Perak
Tourist attractions in Perak
Sunway Group
Water parks in Malaysia